The 2021 PokerGO Cup was the inaugural PokerGO Cup, a series of high-stakes poker tournaments as part of the PokerGO Tour. It was held from inside the PokerGO Studio at Aria Resort & Casino in Las Vegas, Nevada. The series took place from July 6–14, 2021, with eight scheduled events culminating in a $100,000 No-Limit Hold'em tournament. Each final table was streamed on PokerGO.

The player who earns the most points throughout the series would be crowned the PokerGO Cup champion earning $50,000 and the PokerGO Cup.

The Main Event was won by American Cary Katz, and the PokerGO Cup was awarded to Canadian Daniel Negreanu.

Schedule

Series leaderboard 
The 2021 PokerGO Cup awarded the PokerGO Cup to the player that accumulated the most PokerGO Tour points during the series. Canadian Daniel Negreanu won one event and cashed four times on his way to accumulating $996,200 in winnings. Negreanu accumulated 537 points and was awarded the PokerGO Cup.

Results

Event #1: $10,000 No-Limit Hold'em 

 2-Day Event: July 6–7
 Number of Entries: 66
 Total Prize Pool: $660,000
 Number of Payouts: 10
 Winning Hand:

Event #2: $10,000 No-Limit Hold'em 

 2-Day Event: July 7–8
 Number of Entries: 61
 Total Prize Pool: $610,000
 Number of Payouts: 9
 Winning Hand:

Event #3: $10,000 No-Limit Hold'em 

 2-Day Event: July 8–9
 Number of Entries: 53
 Total Prize Pool: $530,000
 Number of Payouts: 8
 Winning Hand:

Event #4: $15,000 No-Limit Hold'em 

 2-Day Event: July 9–10
 Number of Entries: 50
 Total Prize Pool: $750,000
 Number of Payouts: 8
 Winning Hand:

Event #5: $25,000 No-Limit Hold'em 

 2-Day Event: July 10–11
 Number of Entries: 36
 Total Prize Pool: $900,000
 Number of Payouts: 6
 Winning Hand:

Event #6: $25,000 No-Limit Hold'em 

 2-Day Event: July 11–12
 Number of Entries: 36
 Total Prize Pool: $900,000
 Number of Payouts: 6
 Winning Hand:

Event #7: $50,000 No-Limit Hold'em 

 2-Day Event: July 12–13
 Number of Entries: 35
 Total Prize Pool: $1,750,000
 Number of Payouts: 5
 Winning Hand:

Event #8: $100,000 No-Limit Hold'em 

 2-Day Event: July 13–14
 Number of Entries: 23
 Total Prize Pool: $2,300,000
 Number of Payouts: 4
 Winning Hand:

References

External links
 Results

2021 in poker
2021 in sports in Nevada
Television shows about poker
Poker tournaments